Valucha deCastro (October 9, 1930 – February 12, 2007) was a Brazilian-born singer, songwriter and artist. Born in Brazil's Minas Gerais state, she grew up in Rio de Janeiro. she was one of the first students of Chicago, Illinois's Old Town School of Folk Music and later a teacher of Brazilian folk music there. She recorded an album with the Old Town School's Frank Hamilton titled "The World of Frank & Valucha" in 1962. During the 1970s she toured the United States performing Brazilian folk music and in the 1980s, she collaborated with musician/arranger Sergio Bezard who arranged and produced her album "Batuki" and "Trio Rio" with Laura de Lisse on guitar, by the end of the decade they had become the top Brazilian group in Chicago's music world. Later in her life she became a painter, living in Russia and China. She died at her home in Washington, D.C. of liver disease in 2007.

References

American folk musicians
American folk singers
Singers from Chicago
Old Town School of Folk musicians
Deaths from liver disease
1930 births
2007 deaths
20th-century American singers
Brazilian emigrants to the United States